Grit is an unincorporated farming and ranching community  established around 1889 in Mason County, in the U.S. state of Texas. Grit was centered on the cotton industry, and once had its own cotton gin. While never having a large population, the community did have a school, store, and church. The prevailing theory of the town's name is that it reflects the quality of the area soil.
Grit received a post office in 1901, which remained active until 1980.

See also
Fort Mason
 Texas Hill Country

References

External links

Unincorporated communities in Texas
Ghost towns in Central Texas
Unincorporated communities in Mason County, Texas